Rafael Carvajal Guzmán (1818–1881) was the vice president of Ecuador from 1864 to 1865 and the acting president from 31 August 1865 to 7 September 1865.

He was Minister of Finance in 1862 and in 1869.

References

External links
 Official Website of the Ecuadorian Government about the country President's History

1818 births
1881 deaths
Ecuadorian people of Spanish descent
Conservative Party (Ecuador) politicians
Presidents of Ecuador
Vice presidents of Ecuador
Ecuadorian Ministers of Finance